The Conseil scolaire du Grand Nord (known as French-language Public District School Board No. 57 prior to 1999) manages the French-language schools in much of Northern Ontario.

The legal name of the school board is Conseil scolaire public du Grand Nord de l'Ontario, but it is also known as:
 Conseil scolaire du Grand Nord
 CSPGNO, and was known under the name of
 Conseil scolaire de District du Grand Nord de l'Ontario

The CSPGNO is a member of the Association des conseillers(ères) des écoles publique de l'Ontario (ACÉPO).

Elementary schools

High schools

Other public French-language school boards in Ontario 
There are 3 other public French-language school boards in Ontario:
Conseil des écoles publiques de l'Est de l'Ontario (CÉPEO)
Conseil scolaire de district du Nord-Est de l'Ontario (CSDNE)
Conseil scolaire de district du Centre-Sud-Ouest (CSDCSO)

See also 

Association des conseillers(ères) des écoles publique de l'Ontario
List of school districts in Ontario
List of high schools in Ontario

References

External links 
School board web site
Ontario Ministry of Education funding details for 2005-2006
Ministry of Education, School Board Information
Ministry of Education, School Board Profiles

Grand Nord
Education in Greater Sudbury